Teoman is a masculine Turkish given name and a surname. Notable people with the name include:

Given name
 Ali Teoman Germaner (1934–2018) Turkish sculptor
 Teoman Koman (c. 1936–2013), Turkish general
 Teoman (singer), stage name of Fazlı Teoman Yakupoğlu (born 1967), Turkish acoustic rock singer-songwriter
 Teoman Örge (born 1990), Turkish basketball player
 Touman (220 B.C. – unknown), earliest known emperor of the Xiangnu

Surname
 Funda Teoman (born 1984), Turkish pro basketball referee

See also
 Teoman (wrestler), Turkish-German professional wrestler formerly known as Lucky Kid
 Turkish name

Turkish masculine given names